Chibidokuga is a genus of moths of the family Erebidae. The genus was erected by Shōnen Matsumura in 1933.

Species
Chibidokuga hypenodes Inoue, 1979 Japan
Chibidokuga nigra (Hampson, 1898) Sikkim

References

Calpinae
Taxa named by Shōnen Matsumura